Justice Holt may refer to:

Andrew Holt (judge), associate justice of the Minnesota Supreme Court
Homer A. Holt (justice), associate justice of the Supreme Court of Appeals of West Virginia
Henry W. Holt, associate justice and chief justice of the Supreme Court of Virginia
J. Frank Holt, associate justice of the Arkansas Supreme Court
J. Seaborn Holt, associate justice of the Arkansas Supreme Court
Jack Holt Jr., associate justice of the Arkansas Supreme Court
John Holt (Lord Chief Justice), Lord Chief Justice of England
Ryves Holt, associate justice and chief justice of the Delaware Supreme Court
William H. Holt, associate justice and chief justice of the Kentucky Court of Errors and Appeals